The United Arab Emirates is one of the more successful teams in the Asian Cup qualifying for ten editions from 1980 to 2019. They have qualified for the semi-finals on four occasions, as well as the final in 1996, however they have never won an Asian Cup.

Asian Cup record

Record by Opponent

1980 AFC Asian Cup

The UAE would make their first appearance  in the 1980 AFC Asian Cup. This was seen as a historic achievement as it would serve the first stepping stone for UAE's golden era. They would draw to the eventual champions Kuwait, but lose their remaining games and finish bottom of the group.

Group stage

1984 AFC Asian Cup

In the 1984 edition, the UAE would see an improvement as they collected their first two victories against India and Singapore but took two devastating defeats against Iran and China which resulted in another group stage exit.

Group stage

1988 AFC Asian Cup

During the 1988 AFC Asian Cup, the UAE would again lose in the group stages, only winning once against Japan. Despite this devastating campaign, the UAE would qualify for the 1990 FIFA World Cup a year later.

Group stage

1992 AFC Asian Cup

In the 1992 AFC Asian Cup, the United Arab Emirates would qualify for the semi fianls for the first time after winning against North Korea and drawing against Japan and Iran. They would find themselves losing to neighbouring rivals Saudi Arabia and finish fourth after losing a penalty shoot out against China.

Group stage

Semi-final

Third place play-off

1996 AFC Asian Cup

The 1996 Asian Cup would mark as the first time the UAE won the hosting rights and qualified automatically. The UAE would play its opening game to South Korea where they drew 1–1. They would later beat Kuwait and Indonesia and finish at the top of their group with seven points. They would face Iraq in the quarter-finals which ended with the Emirates winning 1–0 during golden goal time which meant the UAE would qualify for the semi-finals for the second consecutive time. They would once again beat Kuwait and qualify for their first final against the Saudis. Unfortunately for the UAE, they would once again find themselves losing to Saudi Arabia after a penalty shootout that resulted in 2–4.

Group stage

Quarter-final

Semi-final

Final

2004 AFC Asian Cup

Even though they were successful in their last run, the UAE would fail to qualify for the 2000 Asian Cup which meant they needed to compensate in this edition. However they would lose two games and draw once, finishing at the bottom of the group with 1 point for the first time since 1980.

Group stage

2007 AFC Asian Cup

Entering this tournament would mark as their seventh appearance and the Emiratis were a contender to make it past the group stage. However the first game resulted in a 0–2 upsetting defeat to Vietnam in which the game would be titled as the Disaster of Hanoi.  They would lose to Japan, thus confirming that the UAE would once again get another early group exit but they would leave with a victory against Qatar and finish third with three points.

Group stage

2011 AFC Asian Cup

In 2011, the UAE would lose to Iraq and Iran but draw to North Korea, this resulted in their worst campaign as they finished at the bottom of the group with zero goals scored.

Group stage

2015 AFC Asian Cup

After three consecutive group stage exits, the UAE would finally get past the group stage after smashing Qatar 4–1 and beating Bahrain 2–1, they would finish second after losing to Iran 0–1 which meant facing the defending champions Japan in the quarter-finals. However, in a surprising turn of events, the UAE would beat Japan in a penalty shootout that ended 5–4. This was seen as one of the biggest upsets in the tournaments history as the Japanese have won the last three out of four Asian cups and are seen as a heavy favourites. Their campaign would end in the semi-finals after a 0–2 loss to the hosts Australia but ultimately finished third place after winning against Iraq 3–2.

Group stage

Quarter-final

Semi-final

Third place play-off

2019 AFC Asian Cup

The UAE would win the hosting rights for the second time in 2019. They would finish first in their group with an unorthodox campaign, drawing to Bahrain and Thailand but winning against India, they only obtained 5 points which is less than any other group champion in that tournament. The UAE would struggle to beat Kyrgyzstan, only winning due to a penalty awarded during extra time. They would beat Australia 1–0 which meant that this was the second consecutive time the defending champion was knocked out by the UAE, coincidentally both were eliminated in the quarter-finals. Unfortunately the UAE would lose the semi-finals for the second consecutive time in an embarrassing 0–4 loss to Qatar and things got dirty when fans started throwing water bottles and footwear to the Qatari players.

Group stage

Round of 16

Quarter-final

Semi-final

Goalscorers

References

United Arab Emirates national football team
Countries at the AFC Asian Cup